Seyon Lodge State Park is a state park near Groton, Vermont in the United States. It is one of seven state parks located in Groton State Forest.

The focus of Seyon Lodge State Park is the 39-acre Noyes Pond. Activities includes bicycling, fly fishing, hiking, picnicking, snowshoeing and cross-country skiing.

The Lodge at Seyon operates year-round and features private lodging, event and meeting facilities for individual guests and groups.

References

External links
Official website

State parks of Vermont
Protected areas of Caledonia County, Vermont
Groton, Vermont